Robert C. Londerholm (July 5, 1931 – December 18, 2015) was an American politician who served as the Attorney General of Kansas from 1965 to 1969.

He died on December 18, 2015, in Redwood City, California at age 84.

References

1931 births
2015 deaths
Kansas Attorneys General
Kansas Republicans